The list of demographic data on each Toronto neighbourhood is taken from the 2006 Canadian census.

Table 
Neighbourhood boundaries are approximated to the nearest census tract. The colours indicate the former municipality (FM):

Purple - Old City of Toronto (OCoT)
Pink - Scarborough (S)
Blue - North York (NY)
Green - Etobicoke (E)
Yellow - York (Y)
Orange - East York (EY)

East York

Etobicoke

North York

Old Toronto

Scarborough

See also 

 Demographics of Toronto
 List of neighbourhoods in Toronto

References